Kenneth William Casey Jr. (born April 15, 1969) is an American musician who is a bass guitarist, primary songwriter, and one of the lead singers of the Boston Celtic punk group the Dropkick Murphys. Casey was one of the original members, starting the band in 1996 with guitarist Rick Barton and singer Mike McColgan. He is the only original member of the Dropkick Murphys left in the band, though drummer Matt Kelly joined shortly after formation in 1997. He is known for his melodic vocal parts and solid punk rock bass playing. Dropkick Murphys released their tenth album Turn Up That Dial on April 30, 2021. Casey also founded the charity group The Claddagh Fund, owns two Boston restaurants, McGreevy's (which closed in August 2020) and Yellow Door Taqueria, and runs his own boxing promotion called Murphys Boxing. Casey has a small role in the 2016 film Patriots Day, about the 2013 Boston Marathon bombing and the subsequent terrorist manhunt.

Early life 
Casey was born and raised in Milton, Massachusetts. The son of Eileen Kelly and Ken Casey Sr., he is of Irish descent. His father died when he was very young and he was brought up under the wing of his grandfather, John Kelly, a teamster and union worker. The Dropkick Murphys song "Boys on the Docks" is dedicated to Kelly.

He worked in various jobs and studied at University of Massachusetts Boston before forming the band.

Personal life
Casey lives in Hingham, Massachusetts with his wife and children.  Casey is a die-hard fan of the Boston Red Sox, Boston Bruins, Boston Celtics and New England Patriots, and participated in the Boston Bruins AT&T Legends Classic hockey game on January 2, 2010. Other participants included Tim Robbins, Bobby Farrelly, Terry O'Reilly, and Lenny Clarke. Casey scored the winning goal for his team in the second period.

Casey was the owner of a sports bar in the Back Bay neighborhood of Boston on Boylston Street near Fenway Park, called McGreevy's, which closed in 2020. It was dedicated to the memory of the founder of the Royal Rooters, "'Nuf Ced" Michael T. McGreevy. He was also part-owner (with Shawn Thornton and Tim Wakefield) of a Pembroke, Massachusetts restaurant called Turner's Yard, which closed in 2014. Casey announced in December 2019 that he will be opening another restaurant, Yellow Door Taqueria, in South End which will open in February 2020. On August 19, 2020, Casey announced that McGreevy's would be closing down after 12 years due to the economic fallout of the COVID-19 pandemic. 

In 2009, Casey founded The Claddagh Fund, a charity foundation based on the attributes of the Irish Claddagh symbolism: "Friendship, Love and Loyalty." It was founded with the help of Boston Bruins legend Bobby Orr.

In October 2014, Casey, a lifelong Democrat, announced that he was co-hosting a fundraiser for Republican gubernatorial candidate Charlie Baker. Casey stated that "Charlie is a Republican and I'm a Democrat, but I will take a big heart and strong character over political party any day." Casey, who publicly backed Mayor Marty Walsh's campaign in 2013, also said that Baker helped several of Dropkick Murphys' charitable causes over the years, including supporting military families. Casey is among many Massachusetts Democrats to have supported Baker.

On May 20, 2016, Casey and the Dropkick Murphys received the "Robert F. Kennedy Children's Action Corps' Embracing the Legacy Award" for years of charity work with various organizations including work with children and military veteran. The award, "which parallels Robert F. Kennedy's quest for social justice on behalf of society's most vulnerable people" will be presented to the band at the Kennedy Library.

In 2018, Ken Casey was involved in a motorcycle accident and suffered severe damage to one of his vertebral disc which required surgery in May 2018 and caused him to lose feeling in his fingers and forced him to be unable to play the bass during the band's shows until he fully healed. The band was unsure if Casey would be able to begin their 2018 summer tour due to the injury. However, Kevin Rheault, the band's longtime stage tech and who filled in for other band members in the past, has filled in on bass at the band's live shows. As of 2021, Casey has still not returned to playing bass during their shows. During a St. Patrick's Day show at the House of Blues on March 17, 2019, Casey attempted to defend fans that were being attacked by another concert-goer. He was hit in the head by a beer can, causing blood to appear on his face, though he stayed on stage and finished the concert while the involved fan was escorted from the building.

In April 2021, Casey announced that he had returned to college at UMass to finish up his college degree which he started decades ago.

On June 24, 2021, Casey along with music artists Dionne Warwick, Sam Moore and Corey Glover appeared in Washington DC at the U.S. Capitol alongside congressmen Ted Deutch and Darrell Issa to help introduce the American Music Fairness Act which would help music performers and recorded-music copyright owners to be paid for airplay on of their songs AM/FM radio stations. The United States currently is the only major country in the world where radio pays no royalties to the performer or copyright owner and only to the songwriter of the song. “I’m a punk rocker! We don’t even want to be played on the radio, but I’m here in support of my fellow musicians. When other people are making millions and billions, well, I think the trickle down should be a little more equitable” Casey said.

Equipment
Being left-handed, Casey primarily plays left-handed Fender Precision Basses through Ampeg SVT bass amplifiers and cabinets with Dropkick Murphys, though he has been seen playing Fender Jazz Basses and, as of 2018, a Duesenberg Starplayer bass as well. He almost always plays with a pick and wears his bass lower than many players, explaining that when he first started playing, he cared more about his bass "being low and looking cool" than a proper strap length.

Murphys Boxing
In 2015, Casey started the boxing promotion, Murphys Boxing. Casey has promoted various local fights in the Boston area which have also aired nationally on television. Danny O' Connor (ranked as one of the top 15 boxers in the world), Spike O'Sullivan, Logan McGuiness, Stephen Ormond and Michael McLaughlin currently fight for Casey's promotion. Casey said of his promotion "My grandfather was an avid boxing fan and an amateur boxer himself. He turned me onto the sport from about the age of three and the band has always had connections too. We have a song about John L. Sullivan (the bare-knuckle champion) and another one about Micky Ward (former WBU light-welterweight champion). But how I actually got into promoting was through my friend Danny O'Connor, who's a boxer from here. I was watching how hard it was for him – training in Texas, trying to sell tickets for his fights up here, he had a newborn baby and, like, how do you sell tickets when you're in Texas? I thought I'd just do some social media, promoting him to the Dropkicks fans, and the next thing you know is that five years later I'm immersed in boxing."

Restaurants and bars
Casey has been involved in the ownership of number of bars and restaurants in the Boston area including the Lower Mills Tavern in Dorchester, McGreevy’s and the Yellow Door Taqueria chain.

References

External links

Dropkick Murphys official web site
Dropkick Murphys Facebook
The Claddagh Fund
Murphys Boxing
McGreevy's
 

1969 births
Living people
American bass guitarists
American punk rock bass guitarists
American male bass guitarists
American male singers
American people of Irish descent
American punk rock musicians
People from Milton, Massachusetts
Dropkick Murphys members
Massachusetts Democrats
Singers from Massachusetts
Guitarists from Massachusetts
20th-century American guitarists